Xiaoqing may refer to:

River
Xiaoqing River

People
Li Xiaoqing (born 1995)
Lim Xiaoqing (born 1967)
Liu Xiaoqing (born 1951)
Xiaoqing Wen
Zuo Xiaoqing (born 1977)

Other uses
Xiaoqing (character), a character in the Chinese Legend of the White Snake